Chiayi City Government is the municipal government of Chiayi City, Taiwan Province, Republic of China.

History

Kingdom of Tungning (1661–1683)
1661, Koxinga came to Taiwan and expel Dutch. Founded first Chinese Government in Taiwan. Established Chengtian Fu, Tianxing County and Wannian County. Chiayi City was belonged to Tianxing County.

Taiwan under Qing rule (1683–1895) 
1683: Taiwan under the Qing dynasty. 1684, Taiwan Prefecture established: Taiwan County, Fongshan County and Tsulo County. The seat of Tsulo located at Jialixing (modern-day Jiali, Tainan).
1704: Tsulo County Government moved to Tsulosan.
1786: The anti-Qing Lin Shuangwen rebellion laid siege to Tsulo County ten months. Citizens of Tsulo County helped Qing Army. Name changed from ″Tsulo″ to "Kagi"/"Chia-i" because ″in meritorious service, Tsulo Citizens defended the county to the last."
1885: Permission was received officially develop Taiwan into a province.
1887: Government reorganized into four prefectures belonging to Fokien-Taiwan Province. Kagi District belonged to Tainan Prefecture, and the district seat was still located in Kagi City.

Taiwan under Japanese rule (1895–1945) 
1895: According to the Treaty of Shimonoseki, Formosa ceded to Japan. Kagi under Tainan Ken (臺南縣).
1920: Kagi upgraded to Kagi District, Tainan Prefecture.
1930: Kagi Town (嘉義街) of Kagi District (嘉義郡) upgraded to Kagi City (嘉義市).

the Republic of China (1945–) 
1945, Japanese Empire was lose World War II, Taiwan Province area recovered, and be subordinated to the Republic of China Government. Chiayi City was a three-class provincial city and subordinated to Taiwan Province. It was the first time Provincial Chiayi City. In that time, Chiayi City divide Xindong District (新東區), Xinxi District (新西區), Xinnan District (新南區) and Xinbei District (新北區).
1946, Shuishang Township and Taibao Township (today's Taibao City) were merged into Chiayi City. In that time, Chiayi City divide Xindong District (新東區), Xinxi District (新西區), Xinnan District (新南區), Xinbei District (新北區), Taibao District (太保區) and Shuishang District (水上區),  total of six districts
1950, Chiayi City was degraded to county-level city, it also was the only county-level city in Chiayi County.
1972, Chiayi City and Hsinchu City upgraded to Provincial City at the same time, and re-establish Chiayi City Government. There are five provincial-cities in Taiwan Province at that time.
1990, because population growth at suburb of Chiayi City ,'''Chiayi City divided East and West two districts.

City flower
Hong Kong Orchid Tree is an evergreen small trees being Caesalpiniaceae. The scientific name is Bauhinia blakeana. It has Bauhinia variegata like appearance and is with large thick leaves and striking purplish red flowers which is like cattleya.
Bauhinia blakeana was imported into Taiwan in 1967. Except its specialty of coquettish flower, there is another quality that the same species, like Bauhinia variegata and Cercis chinensis do not have. Its leaves can survive from winter and the florescence is from winter to spring. It is still splendid and vivid while most flowers of small trees are withered.
Choose Bauhinia blakeana as the city flower of Chiayi is to symbolize the passion of citizens, the beauty and copiousness of municipal construction. The evergreen leaves symbolize thriving and robust of industry and business. The purpose is to anticipate citizens can work on creating a beautiful and prosperous Chiayi city all together.

Municipal emblem

Chiayi City was reformed its status into provincial city on 1 July 1982. The mayor Dr. Shih Sian Syu solicited ideas about the municipal emblem from public then. After assessing, the design from citizen Ming Hong Tsai was selected.
The blue background of the emblem symbolizes magnificence and dignity. The charchters of Chiayi city and plum blossom are white which symbolize brightness. The letters “71” are red which symbolize progress and auspicious. The mark of northern tropic is green which symbolize newly born.
Plum blossom is Taiwan national flower. “71” represents the reformed date 1 July 1982. The mark of northern tropic tells the geographic position of Chiayi city. The four green lines represent reformation and elevation of city status.

Organization

 Mayor
 Deputy mayor
 Secretary-general
 Senior executive
Secretariat
Specialist

Subordinate departments
 Civil Affairs Department
 Finance Department
 Economic Affairs Department
 Social Affairs Department
 General Affairs Department
 Civil Service Ethics Department
 Budget, Accounting and Statistics Department
 Education Department
 Public Works Department
 Transportation Department
 Land Administration Department
 Planning Department
 Personnel Department
 Urban Development Department

First-level agencies
 Police Bureau
 Cultural Affairs Bureau
 Public Health Bureau
 Social Affairs Bureau
 Fire Bureau
 Environmental Protection Bureau
 Local Tax Bureau

Second-level agencies
 East District Household Registration Office
 West District Household Registration Office
 Land Office
 Social Affairs Department
 Mortuary Service Office
 Chiayi City Stadium
 Public Market

District office
 East District Office
 West District Office

Affiliated unit
 East District Health Center
 West District Health Center

Municipal enterprises
Chiayi Fish Market Co., Ltd
Fruit and Vegetable Wholesale Market of Chiayi City Co., Ltd
Chiayi City Meat Market Co., Ltd

Municipal schools

Junior high school
Lantan Junior High School
Nanxing Junior High School
Da-ye Junior High School
Beixing Junior High School
Minsheng Junior High School
Yushan Junior High School
Beiyuan Junior High School

Elementary school
Lantan Elementary School
Datong Elementary School
Shixian Elementary School
Minzu Elementary School
Beiyuan Elementary School
Zhihang Elementary School
Bo'ai Elementary School
Yuren Elementary School
Linsen Elementary School
Xuanxin Elementary School
Chuiyang Elementary School
Chongwen Elementary School
Xingjia Elementary School
Jingzhong Elementary School
Xing'an Elementary School
Gangping Elementary School
Wenya Elementary School

Municipal kindergartens
Chiayi Municipal Wufeng Kindergarten
Chiayi Municipal Fuguo Kindergarten
Attached Kindergarten, Beiyuan Elementary School
Attached Kindergarten, Datong Elementary School
Attached Kindergarten, Lantan Elementary School
Attached Kindergarten, Minzu Elementary School
Attached Kindergarten, Shixian Elementary School
Attached Kindergarten, Zhihang Elementary School
Attached Kindergarten, Yuren Elementary School
Attached Kindergarten, Linsen Elementary School
Attached Kindergarten, Chuiyang Elementary School
Attached Kindergarten, Bo'ai Elementary School
Attached Kindergarten, Jingzhong Elementary School

List of mayors

Access
Chiayi City Hall is accessible within walking distance South of Beimen Station of the Alishan Forest Railway.

See also
 Chiayi City Council

References

External links

 

1982 establishments in Taiwan
Chiayi
Government agencies established in 1982
Local governments of the Republic of China